Oriana Bandiera, FBA (born 26 August 1971) is an Italian economist and academic, specialising in development economics. She has been Professor of Economics at the London School of Economics since 2009. She is currently the Sir Anthony Atkinson Professor of Economics at the London School of Economics, and co-editor of Econometrica. Her area of study primarily concerns organizations and labor markets, and their relationship with the process of economic development.

Early life and education
Bandiera was born on 26 August 1971 in Catania, Sicily, Italy. She studied economics at Bocconi University in Milan, graduating with a Bachelor of Arts (BA) degree in 1993 and a Master of Science (MSc) degree in 1994. She then undertook postgraduate studies in economics at Boston College in the United States: she completed her Doctor of Philosophy (PhD) degree in 2000.

Academic career
Bandiera's research focuses on development economics. She also researches applied microeconomics, incentives in organisations, and labour markets.

In September 1999, Bandiera joined the London School of Economics and Political Science (LSE) in England as a lecturer in economics. From January to March 2003, she was a visiting assistant professor at the University of Chicago. From January to March 2004, she was a visiting assistant professor at the Department of Economics of New York University. She spent April 2004 at the Institute for International Economic Studies (IIES) of Stockholm University. She was a visiting assistant professor at Bocconi University (her alma mater) in March 2005 and at Yale University in April 2005. She returned to the IIES a visiting assistant professor for March 2006. From  March to May 2007, she was a visiting assistant professor at the Center for the Study of Industrial Organization of Northwestern University. In August 2007, she was promoted to Reader in Economics. She was made a Professor of Economics in 2009. Since 2012, she has served as Director of LSE's Suntory and Toyota International Centres for Economics and Related Disciplines (STICERD). She has been Co-Editor of the Journal of Labor Economics since 2014, Economica since 2016, and Microeconomic Insights. She is a fellow of The British Academy, the Econometric Society, CEPR, BREAD, and IZA Institute of Labor Economics.

Research
Bandiera's research interests revolve around the impact of monetary incentives and social relationships on individual behaviour. In terms of research output, Bandiera ranks among the top 2% of economists registered on IDEAS/RePEc. Key results of her research include the following:
 The productivity of the average worker is at least 50% higher under piece rates than under relative incentives, as workers partially internalize the negative social externality of their effort under relative incentives - though only when they can monitor and be monitored -, but don't do so under piece rates (with Imran Rasul and Iwan Barankay). Moreover, the introduction of managerial performance pay is found to result in an increase in both the mean and dispersion of worker productivity, mainly due to managers targeting their efforts toward high ability workers and selecting out the least able workers. By contrast, when managers are paid piece rates, they tend to concentrate on workers with whom they are socially connected irrespective of their ability; overall, even though social connections increase the performance of connected workers, favouritism towards well-connected workers is found to be detrimental to the firm's overall performance. Moreover, workers who have at least one friend who is more able than themselves are willing to increase their effort and hence productivity by 10% (and vice versa if the worker is more able than their friends), which suggests that firms can exploit social incentives as an alternative to monetary incentives to motivate workers. Finally, strengthening team incentives, either through rankings or tournaments, is found to make workers more likely to form teams with others of similar ability instead of with their friends, with rank incentives decreasing average productivity by 14% and tournament incentives increasing it by 24%.
 The relationship between the decision of farmers in Mozambique to adopt a new crop and the adoption choices of their network of family and friends is inverse-U shaped, mitigated by the farmers' own information, and uncorrelated among individuals of different religions (with Imran Rasul).
 Financial liberalization in Chile, Ghana, South Korea, Indonesia, Malaysia, Mexico, Turkey and Zimbabwe failed to increase saving and - especially concerning policies aimed at relaxing liquidity constraints - may have depressed savings (with Patrick Honohan, Fabio Schiantarelli and Gerard Caprio).
 The Sicilian Mafia originated in landowners attempts to protect their land against predatory attacks at a time of widespread banditry, even as doing so deflected thieves on others' properties.
 Highly talented and risk-tolerant managers tend to match with firms that value these characteristics most; a wide array of empirical regularities can be accounted for by a simple model where incentives and matches are endogenously determined (with Luigi Guiso, Andrea prat, and Rafaella Sadun).
 The effect size of university class sizes is only negative and significant for the smallest and largest ranges of class sizes (-0.108 at average class size), with top-scoring students most affected by changes in class size (with Valentino Larcinese and Imran Rasul).
 Four years after an intervention in Uganda that provided adolescent girls with both vocational training and information on sex, reproduction and marriage, girls in treated communities are 48% more likely to engage in income generating activities, 34% less likely to be pregnant, and 62% less likely to be married or cohabiting with a partner (with Niklas Bühren, Robin Burgess, Markus Golstein, Selim Gulesci, Imran Rasul and Munshi Sulaiman).
 As shown in an RCT in Bangladesh, the poor are able to take on the work activities of the non-poor but face barriers to doing so, and, one-off interventions that remove these barriers - e.g. by enabling poor women to start engaging in livestock rearing, lead to sustainable poverty reduction (with Burgess, Narayan Das, Gulesci, Rasul and Sulaiman).
 Providing non-financial rewards to agents recruited by a public health organization to promote HIV prevention and sell condoms in Lusaka (Zambia) was more effective than either financial rewards or volunteering, with the effect of both rewards complementing agents' pro-social motivations and both rewards' effectiveness increasing in their relative value (with Nava Ashraf and Kelsey Jack).
 Some public bodies in Italy pay systematically more than others for equivalent goods, differences are associated with governance structure, and only 17% of the variation in prices is  due to variation in waste that entails utility for the public decision maker (with Andrea Prat and Tommaso Valletti).

Personal life
Bandiera is married to fellow economist Imran Rasul. She has one son and one daughter. She speaks Italian, English, and Spanish.

Honours
Bandiera was awarded the 2007 Young Labor Economist Award by the IZA Institute of Labor Economics in January 2018. In 2011, she was awarded the Carlo Alberto Medal, a medal "awarded to a young Italian economist (resident in Italy or abroad) under the age of 40 for his/her outstanding research contributions to the field of Economics": she is the first woman to be awarded the medal. In 2015, she was elected a Fellow of the British Academy (FBA), the United Kingdom's national academy for the humanities and social sciences. In 2016, she was elected a Fellow of the Econometric Society. In 2018 she won the Ester Boserup Prize for Research on Development for outstanding social science research on development and economic history. In 2019 she was awarded the Yrjö Jahnsson Award, a biennial award given by the Finnish Yrjö Jahnsson Foundation to European economists under the age of 45 "who have made a contribution in theoretical and applied research that is significant to the study of economics in Europe."

References

1971 births
Living people
Italian women economists
Development economists
21st-century  Italian  economists
20th-century Italian  economists
Academics of the London School of Economics
Fellows of the British Academy
Bocconi University alumni
Morrissey College of Arts & Sciences alumni
Writers from Catania
Fellows of the Econometric Society
Fellows of the European Economic Association